A straddle is a type of financial trading strategy using options. Straddle may also refer to:

Straddle bets, a type of poker bet
Straddle carrier, a large vehicle used to move containers around shipping ports
Straddle position, a pose of the human body
Straddle technique in high jump
Straddle (skiing), a gate fault in ski racing
Tax straddle, a technique for avoiding taxes